The 2009–10 Toledo Rockets men's basketball team represented the University of Toledo in the college basketball season of 2009–10. The team, coached by Gene Cross, are members of the Mid-American Conference and played their homes game in Savage Arena. They finished the season 4–28, 1–15 in MAC play and lost in the first round of the 2010 MAC men's basketball tournament. Head coach Gene Cross resigned at the end of the season.

Before the season

Roster changes
The Rockets only return two starters from last year's team, Justin Anyijong and Larry Bastfield.  The other three starters from last season, Tyrone Kent, Jonathan Amos, and Anthony Byrd, were high contributors from that year.  Kent and Amos both had over 13 points per game, and combined for 9.9 rebounds per game, while Byrd had 5.2 points and 2.1 rebounds per game.  Kent found professional play with French team L'Hermine de Nantes.  The team also lost senior Ridley Johnson to graduation.

To replace these seniors, the University of Toledo recruited eight new players, all freshmen, for the 2009–10 season.

Recruiting

Roster
Roster current as of August 27, when their summer prospectus was published.

Coaching staff

Schedule

|-
!colspan=9| Exhibition

|-
!colspan=9| Regular Season

|-
!colspan=9| 2010 MAC men's basketball tournament

|- style="background:#f9f9f9;"
| colspan=9 | *Non-Conference Game.  #Rankings from AP Poll.  All times are in Eastern Time Zone.
|}

References

Toledo Rockets men's basketball seasons
Toledo Rockets